The Armanen-Orden (AO; German for "Armanen Order", "Order of the Armanen") was founded as a  revival of the Ariosophical Guido von List Society by German occultist Adolf Schleipfer (b. 1947) and  his then-wife Sigrun von Schlichting.

The Armanen-Orden is a neopagan esoteric society and religious order reviving the occult teachings of Guido von List. Its internal structure is organized in nine grades, inspired by Freemasonry.  The Order is openly ethnonationalist and racialist, and rejects race-mixing as a modern degeneration.

History
Schleipfer had discovered some of List's works in an antique bookstore in the mid-1960s, and was inspired to found the runic and Armanist magazine Irminsul in hopes of attracting suitable people for a revived Listian order. He was appointed the new president and continued to publish Irminsul as the "Voice of the Guido von List Society."

Schleipfer also attended meetings of a related organisation, the Gode-Orden (Gothi-Order), which propagated a similar mixture of occult völkisch thinking. There he met his wife Sigrun Schleipfer, née Hammerbacher (1940–2009), daughter of the völkisch writer and former NSDAP district leader, Dr. Hans Wilhelm Hammerbacher. In 1976 the Schleipfers founded the Armanen-Orden (Armanen Order) as the reorganised Guido von List Society. Since then, Adolf and Sigrun have served as the Grandmasters of the Order, although they have divorced and Sigrun now refers to herself as "Sigrun von Schlichting" or "Sigrun Freifrau von Schlichting". They also revived the High Armanen Order (HAO) and brought it to "an unprecedented level of activity".
  
The Armanen-Orden celebrates seasonal festivities in a similar fashion as Odinist groups do and invites interested people to these events. The highlights are three 'Things' at Ostara (Easter), Midsummer and Fall (Wotan's sacrificial death), which are mostly celebrated at castles close to sacred places, such as the Externsteine. The author Stefanie von Schnurbein attended a Fall Thing in 1990 and gives the following report in Religion als Kulturkritik (Religion and Cultural Criticism):

In 1977 Sigrun Schleipfer founded the Gemeinschaft zur Erhaltung der Burgen (Society for the Conservation of Castles), which proclaims castles to be among the "last paradises of the romantic era" in this cold modern age and had as its primary aim the purchase and restoration of a castle for the Order. In  1995, the society finally acquired the castle of Rothenhorn in Szlichtyngowa (Poland), a run-down structure dating back to the 12th century, though most of the complex dates from the 16th century.

Over many years, Adolf and Sigrun have republished all of List's works (and many others relating to the Armanen runes) in their original German.  Adolf Schleipfer has also contributed an article to The Secret King, a study of Karl Maria Wiligut by Stephen Flowers and Michael Moynihan, in which he points out the differences between Wiligut's beliefs and those which are accepted within Odinism or Armanism.

Adolf Schleipfer
Adolf Schleipfer, born 1947 , is a German/Austrian occultist and Armanist who re-established the Guido von List Society and Armanen-Orden in 1967 and 1976, respectively.<ref name=book>Religion als Kulturkritik, 1995.  Stefanie von Schnurbein, ISBN . (S. 24 and 25  (S.27ff for her fathers NSDAP reference)) </ref>

Schleipfer re-published all of Guido von Lists works (and many other Armanen runes related works) in their original German.

Schleipfer contributed an article to the book The Secret King entitled "The Wiligut Saga"  pointing out the differences between Wiligut's beliefs and those of Odinism or Armanism.

Adolf re-established the Guido-von-List-Society in 1967. In 1976 with his then wife, Sigrun Schleipfer they founded the Armanen-Orden

Schleipfer published the runic magazine Irminsul (magazine)  in hopes of attracting suitable people for a revived Listian order.

Sigrun Schleipfer (née Hammerbacher), now referring to herself as "Sigrun Freifrau von Schlichting" or "Sigrun von Schlichting") (daughter of Völkisch writer Dr. Hans Wilhelm Hammerbacher ). He is thought to be a former NSDAP district leader

Adolf met Sigrun at meetings of a related organisation, the Gode-Orden (Gothi-Order), which propagated a similar mixture of occult "Völkisch" thinking.

In 1977 she founded the 'Gemeinschaft zur Erhaltung der Burgen' (Society for the Conservation of Castles), which proclaims castles to be among the "last paradises of the romantic era" in this cold modern age and had as its primary aim the purchase and restoration of a castle for the Order. In Yule 1995, the society finally acquired the castle of Rothenhorn in Szlichtyngowa in Poland, a run-down structure dating back to the 12th century, though most of the complex dates from the 16th century.

Since 1976 Adolf and Sigrun have served as the "Grandmasters" of the order.

Adolf  also revived the High Armanen Order (HAO).

They have also been, for many years, reprinting List's works.

See also
Armanism
Ariosophy
Neopaganism in German-speaking Europe

Notes

Bibliography

 Balzli, Johannes – ‘Guido v. List – Der Wiederentdecker uralter arischer Weisheit (Leipzig and Vienna, 1917)’
; originally published as 

 Franziska Hundseder: Wotans Jünger. Neuheidnische Gruppen zwischen Esoterik und Rechtsradikalismus. Heyne, München 1998, (Heyne Sachbuch''), S. 126–132.

External links
 Official website
Works by and about Adolf Schleipfer in the German National Library catalogue
"The Wiligut Saga" from the book The Secret King.

Germanic mysticism
Guido von List
Organizations established in 1976
1976 establishments in Germany
Modern pagan organisations based in Germany
Germanic neopagan organisations
Modern pagan organizations established in the 1970s